Indian-made foreign liquor (IMFL) is the official term used by governments, businesses and media in India to refer to all types of liquor manufactured in the country other than indigenous alcoholic beverages such as feni, toddy, arrack and others.

IMFL is also referred to spirits that are produced in foreign countries and imported to India in bulk quantities and bottled in an Excise Bonded Warehouse by the Importers.

Manufacturing 
When locally manufactured, the various types of IMFLs are supposed to be produced using their traditional methods, such as fermenting grain mash to produce whiskey. However, a common characteristic of many IMFLs, distinct from spirits elsewhere in the world, is that irrespective of the final product the starting ingredient is a neutral spirit distilled from molasses, a byproduct of the sugar industry. This neutral spirit at 96% alcohol by volume is first reduced to 42.8% using demineralised water, whereupon flavours and other spirits are added. Caramel colouring is added at this stage to impart colour to the spirit. Most commonly, grain or malt-based whisky, which may include imported Irish or Scotch whisky is blended with the spirit.

See also

 Alcoholic Indian beverages
 Beer in India 
 Desi daru
 Indian whisky
 Lion beer, Asia'a first beer brand
 Solan No. 1, India's first malt whisky
 Old Monk, iconic Indian rum
 Sura

Other India alcohol related
 Alcohol laws of India
 Alcohol prohibition in India
 Dry Days in India
 Kasauli Brewery, India's first European-style brewery still in operation
 Solan brewery

References

External links
 India's Ministry of Food Processing Industries page on alcoholic drinks

Indian distilled drinks
Alcohol law in India